The Ministry of Economy of Armenia is a ministry within the Government of Armenia.

History 
It was formed in 1990 after the reorganization of the State Planning Committee of the Soviet Socialist Republic of Armenia.
 
On 10 June 1997, in accordance with Armenian Presidential Decree No. 747 on "Changes in Structure of the Government of the Republic of Armenia” the Ministry of Trade, Services and Tourism, the Ministry of Industry, and the Ministry of Economy were merged into one ministry: the Ministry of Industry and Trade of the Republic of Armenia.
 
On 16 March 2002, in accordance with Presidential Decrees No. 1063 and 1064, the Ministry of Industry and Trade was reorganized into the Ministry of Trade and Economic Development.
 
On 21 April 2008, in accordance with a Presidential Decree, the Ministry of Trade and Economic Development was renamed the Ministry of Economy of the Republic of Armenia. On 29 September 2016 the ministry was again renamed, this time to the Ministry of Economic Development and Investments of the Republic of Armenia.

There are 22 structural and three separate departments in the organizational structure of the Ministry of Economy. Also, four state organizations and companies operate within the Ministry.

In March 2019 Ministry of Agriculture was merged into the Ministry of Economic Development and Investments, and the latter was renamed to Ministry of Economy.

Ministers

See also

Economy of Armenia

References

External links
 Ministry of Economy on Facebook

Economy
Armenia